Qaleh Qazi or Qaleh-ye Qazi or Qaleh-i-Qazi, also rendered as Ghaleh Ghazi, may refer to various places in Iran:
Qaleh Qazi, East Azerbaijan
Qaleh Qazi, Hamadan
Qaleh Qazi, Hormozgan
Qaleh-ye Qazi, Kerman
Qaleh Qazi-ye Olya, Kermanshah Province
Qaleh Qazi-ye Sofla, Kermanshah Province
Qaleh-ye Qazi, Khuzestan
Qaleh Qazi District, in Hormozgan Province
Qaleh Qazi Rural District, in Hormozgan Province